are issued to Japanese citizens to facilitate international travel. As of 2022, with holders able to travel visa-free to 193 countries and territories, it has been ranked as the most powerful passport in the world.

History
The first travel documents for overseas travel by Japanese citizens were introduced in 1866, near the end of the Tokugawa shogunate. These documents took the form of a stamped "letter of request" allowing Japanese citizens to travel overseas for business and educational purposes. The first person to be issued with a Japanese travel document was the acrobat and magician Namigorō Sumidagawa (ja:隅田川浪五郎), who received his travel document on 17 October 1866 in order to perform at the 1867 World's Fair held in Paris, France. The term "passport" was formally introduced into the Japanese language in 1878, and in 1900 the first regulations governing the usage of Japanese passports were introduced. The modern form of the Japanese passport first came about in 1926, and the first ICAO-compliant, machine-readable Japanese passports were introduced in 1992.

Types of passports
 Ordinary passport: Issued to normal Japanese citizens.
 Ordinary passports are issued in two different lengths of validity: 5 and 10 years. Japanese citizens up to 16 years of age can only be issued a 5 years passport, while those who are 17 years of age or older can choose either a 5 years (blue) or 10 years (red) passport for different registration fees.
 Official passport: Issued to members of the National Diet and public servants.
 Diplomatic passport: Issued to members of the Imperial Family, diplomats and their family members, and high-level government officials.
 By convention, the Emperor and Empress of Japan do not hold a passport, as they cannot travel on a document issued in their own name.
 Emergency passport: Issued to overseas Japanese nationals when machine-readable passports are unable to be issued by a diplomatic mission of Japan due to a malfunction and there is no time to wait for the passport to be issued by the Ministry of Foreign Affairs of Japan, or to overseas Japanese nationals who failed to be issued a Travel Document for Return to Japan, valid for 1 year from date of issuance.
 Travel Document for Return to Japan (ja:帰国のための渡航書): Emergency single-use travel document issued to overseas Japanese nationals to return to Japan, features a white cover with the Paulownia Government Seal of Japan. Invalidated immediately after use.

All Japanese passports issued after 20 March 2006 are biometric passports.

Japanese passports have the Chrysanthemum Imperial Seal of Japan inscribed in the centre of the front cover, with the Japanese characters reading Nipponkoku Ryoken (日本国旅券) inscribed above in seal script and its English translation JAPAN PASSPORT in Latin letters below the Seal. Ordinary passports valid for five years feature dark blue covers, and those valid for ten years feature crimson-coloured covers. Additionally, official passports feature dark green covers, and diplomatic passports feature dark brown covers.

Data page
Photo of the passport holder
Type
Issuing country
Passport number
Surname (possibly followed by a former surname or an alternative surname written in brackets)
Given name (possibly followed by an alternative give name written in brackets)
Nationality (Japan)
Date of birth
Sex
Registered Domicile
Date of issue
Date of expiry
Issuing authority
Signature of bearer

The information page ends with the Machine Readable Zone.

Passport photo requirements 
Photo for Japan passport should meet specific requirements:

 Size: 35mm by 45mm and(pixels): 600 dpi minimum.
 Head size and position: From chin to forehead should be 32mm to 36mm.
 Photo must be in color.
 Must be taken in the last 6 months.
 Background: Solid white only. No other objects visible, like door, windows etc.
 Neutral face expression.
 2 passport photos per application.
 Head cover is allowed for religious or medical reasons.

Passport note
The passports contain a note from the issuing country that is addressed to the authorities of all other countries, identifying the bearer as a citizen of that country and requesting that he or she be allowed to pass and be treated according to international norms. The note inside of Japanese passports states:

In Japanese:
日本国民である本旅券の所持人を通路故障なく旅行させ、かつ、同人に必要な保護扶助を与えられるよう、関係の諸官に要請する。　日本国外務大臣

In English:
The Minister for Foreign Affairs of Japan requests all those whom it may concern to allow the bearer, a Japanese national, to pass freely and without hindrance and, in case of need, to afford him or her every possible aid and protection.

Language
Japanese passports are entirely printed in both Japanese and English, except for the note of caution that is found at the end of the passport (e.g. on page 51 of the ten-year biometric ordinary passport), which is only printed in Japanese. This note contains information about what the bearer should know when encountering various situations in a foreign country.

The surname, given name and other personalised mentions (like registered domicile) are only indicated in Latin uppercase letters. Japanese names are in principle transcribed according to the Hepburn romanisation system, but exceptions are admitted in certain cases, notably when the name is the katakana transcription of a foreign name (such as Japanese spouse or Japanese child of a foreigner), in which case the original spelling of the name in the Latin alphabet may be used.

The signature may be written in any language and in any spelling the individual desires.

Visa requirements

Visa requirements for Japanese citizens are administrative entry restrictions by the authorities of other states which are placed on citizens of Japan. As of 6 August 2022, Japanese citizens had visa-free or visa on arrival access to 193 countries and territories, ranking the Japanese passport the strongest passport in the world in terms of travel freedom according to the Henley Passport Index. Additionally, Arton Capital's Passport Index ranks the Japanese passport third strongest in the world with a mobility score of 169 (tied with Belgian, Danish, Irish, New Zealand, Polish, Portuguese and United States passports), as of 6 August 2022. However, suspension of visa waivers and travel restrictions toward Japanese passport holders since January 2020 due to the COVID-19 pandemic puts this statement into doubt.

Gallery of Japanese passports

See also

Japan Re-entry Permit 
Foreign relations of Japan
Japanese nationality law
Visa requirements for Japanese citizens

Notes

References

External links

Passports by country
Law of Japan